Olfactory receptor family 10 subfamily A member 2 is a protein that in humans is encoded by the OR10A2 gene.

Function 

Olfactory receptors interact with odorant molecules in the nose, to initiate a neuronal response that triggers the perception of a smell. The olfactory receptor proteins are members of a large family of G-protein-coupled receptors (GPCR) arising from single coding-exon genes. Olfactory receptors share a 7-transmembrane domain structure with many neurotransmitter and hormone receptors and are responsible for the recognition and G protein-mediated transduction of odorant signals. The olfactory receptor gene family is the largest in the genome. The nomenclature assigned to the olfactory receptor genes and proteins for this organism is independent of other organisms. [provided by RefSeq, Jul 2008].

Genetic differences
OR10A2 (as well as OR6A2 which is located near it on chromosome 11) has been proposed as a candidate gene responsible for the genetic portion of the variation in cilantro preference.

References

Further reading 

Olfactory receptors